Neonegeta is a genus of moths in the family Nolidae. The genus was erected by George Hampson in 1912.

Species
Neonegeta arboccoae Berio, 1987
Neonegeta atriflava Hampson, 1912
Neonegeta pollusca (Schaus, 1893)
Neonegeta purpurea Hampson, 1912
Neonegeta trigonica (Hampson, 1905)
Neonegeta xanthobasis (Hampson, 1905)
Neonegeta zelia (Druce, 1887)

References

Chloephorinae